Manjil Virinja Poovu  is an Indian Malayalam-language television drama. It premiered on 4 March 2019 on Mazhavil Manorama everyday at 7.30 PM IST and streams on ManoramaMax. The show is produced by Prabha Unnithan under the banner of Sree Movies. It stars Malavika Wales in the titular role along with Rekha Ratheesh, Yuva Krishna and Akhil Anand. It is one of the top-rated TV series in Mazhavil Manorama since its inception.

Plot
The series portrays the story of a young girl Anjana Shankaran who worked as a worker in a tea plantation who later became a District Collector and at last became The Chief Minister of Kerala. The story revolves around the sudden happenings in the life of Anjana.

Cast

Main 
 Malavika Wales as Chief Minister Anjana Shankaran IAS: First female Chief Minister of Kerala; Former sub-collector of Devikulam; Manu's wife.
 Rekha Ratheesh as Mallika Prathap: Anjana's mother-in-law.
 Yuva Krishna as Manu Prathap: Anjana's husband.

Recurring 
 Akhil Anand as Pichathi Shaji, biological son of Raghuram. Husband of Suja.
 Akhilesh as Rajeevnath, former CEO of Corporate India and Sona's father
 Akhina Shibu as Suja, former caretaker of Prathibhamma. Wife of Shaji.
 Jismy (Episode 1-525, Episode 535-Present) / Lekshmi Surendran (Episode 527-534) as Sona, Rajeevnath' s daughter and Vinay's Wife
 Bimal Joy as Ananthan, Shaji's friend and assistant
Joe Varghese as Vinayan, son of Prathiba and Das. Husband of Sona. Foster son of Bhaskaran.
 Shalu Menon as Prathibha
Geetha as Sreelekha IPS

Supporting Cast
_ as enathamma

Sindhu Jacob as Mariam Lucos, MLA
Daveed John as Commissioner Sethupathi IPS
Swathi Thara as Leona Alex, Head of UK spring crown consultancy who places Anjana as the Chief consultant
 Vriddhi Vishal as Anumol. 
 Justin George Mathew as Arun, childhood friend of Anjana, Anjana's ex-lover
 Anas Abbas as Anoop
 Resh Lakshna as Maya, ex-lover of Manu
 Pinky Kannan as Teena, Mallika's Personal assistant
 Vikraman as Shankaran, Anjana's Father
Ajoobsha as Praveen
Prajusha as Sister
Vinod Nair as Manager
Givanios Pullan
Anusree (Prakrithi) as Young Mallika
Stelna as Mallika's mother
Arun Mohan as Krishnadas, husband of Prathiba
Poojappura Radhakrishnan as Madhavan, Anjana's driver
Hari Shankar as Commissioner Raghu Raj IPS
Anil K Sivaram as Indran
Rijin Raj as Girish, son of Mulamoottil Shekaran. Brother of Rejitha.
 as Mulamoottil Shekaran. Father of Girish and Rejitha. Former driver of Raghuram. Later a businessman and a criminal. Second husband of Reghuram's widow. 
RJ Kripesh as Praveen.
Neeraja Pillai as Rejitha, daughter of Mulamoottil Shekaran. Sister of Girish. 
Renu as Mathiparu
 as Pushpa
as Kalyani, domestic help of PK NILAYAM
Jayan as Dr.Janardhanan
Syam S Namboothiri as Jayalal
Chandrabhanu Sahiti as Driver Chandran
Binil Khader as Sabu Cherian, friend and former classmate of Manu Prathap.
Rajesh Narayanan as Kanneth Krishnan, CPC member.
Pramod Mani as Bimal Krishnan. Son of Kanneth Krishnan. Friend of Moncy. One of the two young men who kidnaps Bhaskaran, shoots Bhaskaran to death, and repeatedly tries to kill Anjana. Later killed by Anjana.
Jasmir Khan as Moncy. Friend of Bimal Krishnan. One of the two young men who kidnaps Bhaskaran, shoots Bhaskaran to death, and repeatedly tries to kill Anjana. Later killed by Anjana.
Priyanka Chandran as Valli
Murugan Panavila as former police officer Joseph Samuel.
Bijikumar as Constable
 Shobi Thilakan as Bhaskaran
Kiran Raj as Mohammad bin Azadi, drug mafia and underworld don.
Adarsh as Shine
Auto driver
Athira Praveen as Leomi
Bindu Krishna as Leomi's mother
Ravikrishnan Gopalakrishnan as Sharma

Guest 
 Shwetha Menon as herself

References

External links 
 

2019 Indian television series debuts
Malayalam-language television shows
Mazhavil Manorama original programming